Zhu Shijie (1900 - 1990) was a Chinese painter and educator, who is regarded as one of the fathers of Chinese oil painting and an important art educator of his time. Born in Suzhou, Jiangsu province, Zhu began studying painting in 1912 and founded the Suzhou Art Academy in 1922. In the 1920s, Zhu went to Japan and brought back to China the Bauhaus concepts and ideas of practical art. Zhu, along with Yan Wenliang and Hu Cuizhong comprise the “Three Masters of Suzhou”.

Early life
Zhu Shijie studied traditional Chinese paintings, including flower, bird, and landscape, under Yan Chunsheng and Fan Shaoyun in 1912.

Career 

In 1922, along with two other artists Yan Wenliang and Hu Cuizhong, He established the Suzhou Academy of Fine Arts. In a national reorganisation in 1952, the Suzhou Fine Arts Institute and the Shanghai Fine Arts Academy were incorporated into the Nanjing Academy of Fine Arts. Zhu, Yan and Hu were passionate about reforming traditional art education in China. They attempted to modernise Chinese art education by introducing western concepts and methods in their school.

The Academy fundraised and bought a large amount of torso and plaster from Paris in the late 1930s. While in Europe, Yan assembled a collection of plaster casts of famous European sculptures, which totaled as many as 500 pieces, which he shipped home to be used at the Academy. Zhu was then tasked to fix those sculptures that were damaged during transit.

Many well-known artists were nurtured such as Luo Erchun, Mo Pu and Fei Yifu.

For a large part of his life, Zhu taught in Eastern China College of Art, the former Nanjing Academy of Fine Arts.

Work

9 works including "Jing Gangshan Mountain" and "Small Wharf at Dongting Lake" are part of the collection of the National Art Museum of China in Beijing.

His important works such as "Net Casting" and "View of the Bridge" are at Jiangsu Fine Arts Museum.

A sizable portion of Zhu's work is in private collections in Taiwan and Hong Kong.

See also 
Yan Wenliang
 The Bauhaus

Notes 

1900 births
1990 deaths
Republic of China painters
Academic staff of China Academy of Art
Victims of the Cultural Revolution
Painters from Suzhou
20th-century Chinese painters
Educators from Suzhou
Chinese art educators